Take Me to Baltimore is the third and final studio album to date by English singer Ruth Copeland. It was her only album released on RCA Records in 1976 and it was produced by Ralph Moss and her RCA labelmate Daryl Hall of Hall & Oates.  It is currently out of print.  The rights are held with Sony Music Entertainment.

Track listing 
Side One
"Win Or Lose" (Jesse Rae)
"Milky Way Man" (Daryl Hall, Ruth Copeland)
"Oh Baby" (Howard Harris, Ruth Copeland)
"Here You Come Again" (Eric Thorngren, John Turi, Ruth Copeland, William Hocher)
"Cliches" (Eric Thorngren, Ruth Copeland)

Side Two
"Heaven" (Daryl Hall, Ruth Copeland)
"Take Me to Baltimore" (Dick Wagner, Ruth Copeland)
"Some Hearts Need to Sing The Blues" (John Turi, Ruth Copeland)
"If You Don't Want My Love" (Eric Thorngren, John Turi, Ruth Copeland)
"Senses" (Eric Thorngren)

Personnel
Ruth Copeland – vocals
Bob Kulick, Dick Wagner, Eric Thorngren – guitar
Francisco Centeno – bass
John Turi, Ralph Schuckett – keyboards
Steve Jordan – drums
Jimmy Maelen – percussion
Michael Brecker, Randy Brecker – horns
Robin Kenyatta – alto saxophone, flute
Jesse Rae, William Hocher – backing vocals
Patrick Adams – string and horn arrangements
Technical
Frankie D'Augusta, Ralph Moss – engineer

References

1976 albums
Ruth Copeland albums
RCA Records albums